Jessie Maduka (born 23 April 1996) is a German athlete specialising in the triple jump. Earlier in her career she competed in the sprints and won a silver medal in the 4 × 100 metres relay at the 2012 World Junior Championships.

Her personal bests in the triple jump are 13.95 metres outdoors (-0.4 m/s, London 2018) and 13.81 metres indoors (Dortmund 2018).

Between 2014 and 2018 she studied at UCLA.

International competitions

References

1996 births
Living people
German female triple jumpers
Sportspeople from Düsseldorf
German expatriates in the United States
UCLA Bruins women's track and field athletes
20th-century German women
21st-century German women